Pocius is the masculine form of a Lithuanian family name. Its feminine forms  are: Pocienė or Pociuvienė (married woman or widow) and Pociūtė (unmarried woman).

The surname may refer to:

Antanas Pocius - choirmaster, organist and composer.
Arvydas Pocius - chief of Defense of Lithuania.
Arvydas Pocius (1958) - director-general of state security department of Lithuania (2004-2007).
Martynas Pocius - a basketball player for Real Madrid and a member of the Lithuania national basketball team.

Lithuanian-language surnames